Sibylle Brauner (born 16 March 1975 in Raubling) is a retired German alpine skier who competed in the 2002 Winter Olympics.

External links
 sports-reference.com

1975 births
Living people
Olympic alpine skiers of Germany
Alpine skiers at the 2002 Winter Olympics
German female alpine skiers
People from Rosenheim (district)
Sportspeople from Upper Bavaria
21st-century German women